Lucas Gourna-Douath (born 5 August 2003) is a French professional footballer who plays as a midfielder for Austrian Bundesliga club Red Bull Salzburg.

Club career

Saint-Étienne
On 6 May 2020, Gourna-Douath signed his first professional contract with Saint-Étienne at the age of 16. He made his professional debut in a 2–0 Ligue 1 win over Strasbourg on 12 September 2020.

Red Bull Salzburg
On 13 July 2022, Austrian club Red Bull Salzburg announced the signing of Gourna-Douath on a five-year contract. The transfer fee paid to Saint-Étienne was a reported €15 million, making him the most expensive signing in the history of Austrian football.

International career
Gourna-Douath was born in France and is of Central African Republic descent. He is a youth international for France.

References

External links
 
 
 ASSE Profile

2003 births
Living people
Sportspeople from Villeneuve-Saint-Georges
French footballers
France youth international footballers
French sportspeople of Central African Republic descent
Association football midfielders
US Sénart-Moissy players
US Torcy players
AS Saint-Étienne players
FC Red Bull Salzburg players
Championnat National 2 players
Ligue 1 players
Austrian Football Bundesliga players
2. Liga (Austria) players
Black French sportspeople
French expatriate footballers
Expatriate footballers in Austria
French expatriate sportspeople in Austria
Footballers from Val-de-Marne